Sharoysky District (Şaroyn khoşt) is an administrative and municipal district (raion), one of the fifteen in the Chechen Republic, Russia. It is located in the south of the republic. The administrative center of the administrative district is the rural locality (a selo) of Sharoy; however, the selo of Khimoy serves as the administrative center of the municipal district. Population:   The population of Sharoy accounts for 9.1% of the district's total population.

References

Notes

Sources

External links
Official website of the Chechen Republic. Information about Sharoysky District 

Districts of Chechnya

